Alaska Railroad 557 is an S160 class 2-8-0 "Consolidation" type steam locomotive built in 1944 by the Baldwin Locomotive Works for the U.S. Army Transportation Corps during World War II. It was subsequently transferred to the Alaska Railroad to pull freight trains, maintenance trains, and occasional passenger trains throughout the state of Alaska. It was the last steam locomotive to be removed from service on the railroad before it was sold to a scrap dealer in Everett, Washington and then to Monte Holm, who operated it a few times and displayed it in his House of Poverty Museum. No. 557 returned to Alaska in January 2012, and as of 2023, it is undergoing a rebuild to operate on the Alaska Railroad.

History

Revenue service 
No. 557 was constructed in 1944 by the Baldwin Locomotive Works in Philadelphia, Pennsylvania originally as U.S. Army Transportation Corps No. 3523. It was one of over 2,120 S160 class 2-8-0s constructed for the United States Army Transportation Corps to be shipped to Europe or Africa during the Second World War. Between 1943 and 1946 twelve S160s were placed in service on the Alaska Railroad to operate in the state of Alaska. Under Alaska Railroad ownership, the locomotive was renumbered to 557 and modified for use on the Railroad's mainline and to withstand the frozen weather; large compound air compressors were mounted on the pilot deck, and steam generators and coils were installed to provide heat inside the cab for the crews. The locomotive would also occasionally be equipped with a snowplow to clear the trackage of snow during the winter months.

The Alaska Railroad initially assigned No. 557 as a Maintenance-of-Way (MOW) locomotive, hauling work trains to repair rails and track beds throughout the railroad's system. It was also occasionally used to pull short-distance passenger trains out of Anchorage. By the end of 1954, the Alaska Railroad had retired all of their coal-fired steam locomotives, with the exception of No. 557, which was converted from burning coal to burning oil. The locomotive was kept in the Alaska Railroad’s roster, primarily so it would be reassigned to pull trains and switch rolling stock throughout Nenana while resisting the high-water conditions in the town. The Tanana and Nenana Rivers regularly flooded the town and the rail yard, and the traction motors of the railroad’s diesel locomotives of the time were not water-resistant. 

After the railroad acquired diesel locomotives with water-proof traction motors, No. 557 was put into storage on August 31, 1957 inside the Whittier engine house. Less than two years later, the locomotive was cleaned and repaired to be used to pull occasional fan trips for special events, such as a National Railway Historical Society (NRHS) excursion runs between Whittier and Anchorage, and the annual state fair trains in Palmer. No. 557’s last run occurred on September 5, 1960, and it became the last steam locomotive to be removed from the Alaska Railroad's active roster.

Preservation 
In 1964, the No. 557 locomotive was sold to Monte Holm, a scrap dealer who owned the Michaelson Steel and Supply Company in Everett, Washington. On June 14, 1965, the locomotive was loaded onto the Train Ship Alaska barge, and it was shipped and unloaded in Seattle, and from there, it was towed to Everett. Holm withheld No. 557 for preservation, and he moved it to his newly-founded House of Poverty Museum in Moses Lake, Washington for static display purposes. The locomotive was parked on a 210-foot private rail line owned by Holm while being paired with a tender from a Copper River and Northwestern locomotive, and it spent more than four decades on static display while several people witnessed it during the museum tours. On May 4, 2006, Holm had passed away at the age of 89, and his grandsons, Steven and Larry Rimple, subsequently assumed ownership of his museum relics, including No. 557, and they slowly began selling them off.

In 2011, Jim and Vic Jansen acquired No. 557 from the Holm estate with the hopes of returning the locomotive to Alaska. The Jansens are the owners of several Alaska-based transportation companies, and they donated the locomotive to the Alaska Railroad. The railroad’s Vice President, Steve Silverstein, who had become aware of No. 557’s significance since 2001, ordered that No. 557 be moved and rehabilitated in Anchorage and be rebuilt for operational purposes. In December of that year, the locomotive was removed from display, loaded onto a flatcar, and towed to a harbor in Seattle, where it was loaded into a rail barge to be shipped to Whittier. Upon arrival in Whittier on January 3, 2012, No. 557 was towed by two EMD GP40’s toward Anchorage before being unloaded from the flatcar, touching Alaska soil for the first time since 1965. Initially, the locomotive was believed to be in good mechanical condition. (Later it was found to have severe wear and in need of a major overhaul.) It was stored inside the Anchorage diesel facility until August of that year, when No. 557 was hauled by truck to an engine house in Wasilla, where restoration work would commence. 

The Alaska Railroad formed a non-profit organization called the Engine 557 Restoration Company, which would be dedicated to rebuilding the locomotive with volunteer labor while raising funds. The cost to rebuild No. 557 was estimated to reach $600,000-$700,000. As of 2022, restoration work on No. 557 is still underway; boiler work is getting closer to being completed, a U.S. Army tender was acquired from the nearby Museum of Alaska Transportation for use behind No. 557, the frame and running gear have been reworked, and the cab has been refurbished with several gauges and controls being installed inside. Although the Alaska Railroad still owns No. 557, the restoration company will be in charge of operating and maintaining the locomotive, once it returns to service.

See also 

Great Smoky Mountains Railroad 1702
Tennessee Valley Railroad 610
McCloud Railway 18
McCloud Railway 25
Lake Superior and Ishpeming 18
Robert Dollar Co. No. 3

References

External links
Engine 557 Restoration Company

USATC S160 Class
Baldwin locomotives
Railway locomotives introduced in 1944
Preserved steam locomotives of Alaska
Individual locomotives of the United States
Standard gauge locomotives of the United States
United States Army locomotives